Nikolay Nikolayevich Udovichenko (born 1962) is a Russian diplomat and was the former Ambassador of the Russian Federation to the Federal Republic of Nigeria.

Education
Udovichenko attended the
Moscow State Institute of International Relations (MGIMO). He graduated in 1984 and was subsequently recruited by the Ministry of Foreign Affairs.

Career
Between 2005 and 2013, he held the position of Deputy Head of the 2nd CIS Department of the MFA of Russia. On 1 April 2013, he became the Ambassador Extraordinary and Plenipotentiary of the Russian Federation to the Federal Republic of Nigeria.

Personal life
Udovichenko speaks English and Hungarian fluently. He is married with two children, an adult son and daughter.

See also
 Nigeria–Russia relations
 List of ambassadors of Russia to Nigeria

References

External links
 Government of Russia

1962 births
Place of birth missing (living people)
Living people
Moscow State Institute of International Relations alumni
Ambassador Extraordinary and Plenipotentiary (Russian Federation)
Ambassadors of Russia to Nigeria
Ambassadors of Russia to Kyrgyzstan